Lodi is an unincorporated community in Wayne County, Missouri, United States. It is located on Bennett Creek, just east of the St. Francis River. U.S. Route 67 passes through the community, approximately thirteen miles northeast of Piedmont. The Coldwater Conservation Area lies to the northeast of Lodi and Sam A. Baker State Park lies to the west across the St. Francis River.

A post office called Lodi has been in operation since 1892. The name most likely is a transfer from Lodi, Italy.

References

Unincorporated communities in Wayne County, Missouri
Unincorporated communities in Missouri